Pisaflores is a town and one of the 84 municipalities of Hidalgo, in central-eastern Mexico. The municipal seat lies at Pisaflores (municipality).  The municipality covers an area of 159.3 km².

As of 2005, the municipality had a total population of 17,214. 

Pisaflores also has Tepehuas who are Eastern Orthodox Christians (Sandstrom 2005).

References 

Sandstrom, Alan R., and Enrique Hugo García Valencia. 2005. Native peoples of the Gulf Coast of Mexico. Tucson: University of Arizona Press.

Municipalities of Hidalgo (state)
Populated places in Hidalgo (state)